Satguru Mata Sudiksha Ji Maharaj (born 13 March 1985) is the spiritual head of the Nirankari Mission.

Life and background 
Satguru Mata Sudiksha Ji was appointed the head of the mission in 2018 after her mother Satguru Mata Savinder Hardev's health deteriorated.

In 2019 Satguru Mata Sudiksha Ji attended a three-day Nirankari Youth Symposium in the UK and met civic leaders in Sandwell. She also gave her first talk to her Indian followers in Pathankot in the same year and inaugurated a mega blood donation camp in Delhi.

In 2021 she provided a virtual new year message to her followers and promoted human values at the 54th Nirankari conference held in Maharashtra.

Awards and recognitions 
In 2019 Satguru Mata Sudiksha Ji received an Honorary Citizenship of Blacktown, Australia.

References 

Female religious leaders
Sikh religious leaders
1985 births
Living people
Honorary citizens
Indian women religious leaders